Anthony "A. J." Wood (born August 17, 1973, in Pittsburgh, Pennsylvania) is a retired American soccer forward who played six seasons in Major League Soccer.  He was a member of the United States U-16 men's national soccer team at the 1989 FIFA U-16 World Championship and also played for the U.S. at the 1996 Summer Olympics

Youth
Wood grew up in the Washington, D.C. area where he attended high school at the parochial Georgetown Preparatory School.  He was a forward on the boys soccer team and was the city high school player of the year in 1990.  In 1991, he entered the University of Virginia where he played as a forward on the men's soccer team until 1994.  Although never selected as a first or second team All American, he was named the 1994 SoccerAmerica Player of the Year.  The Cavaliers won the NCAA championship each of the four years Wood played.  He also holds the NCAA tournament record of 13 goals.

International
In 1989, he was a member of the U.S. U-16 national team at the U-16 World Cup.  While the U.S. went 1–1–1 and failed to make the second round, it did defeat Brazil, making it the first U.S. team to do so.  Beginning in 1994, Wood became a regular on the United States U-23 men's national soccer team as it prepared for the 1996 Summer Olympics.   In 1995, he was a member of the U.S. team which went 0–3 at the Pan American Games.  Then in 1996, Wood was part of the U.S. Olympic team and saw time in all three games as the U.S. went 1–1–1 and failed to make the second round.

Professional
In 1996, the MetroStars of Major League Soccer (MLS) selected Wood in the 5th round (49th overall) of the 1996 MLS Inaugural Player Draft.  This was the league's first draft and the team's began their first season of operation in 1996.  Wood spent the 1996 season and thirteen games in 1997 with the MetroStars before being traded to the Columbus Crew for Brian Bliss.  At the end of the season, MLS expanded to two cities, Miami and Chicago.  In order to build the new teams, MLS held an expansion draft.  The Crew did not protect Wood and as a result, on November 6, 1997, the Chicago Fire took him with the 21st selection of the 1997 MLS Expansion Draft.  However, Wood never played for the Fire as of January 6, 1998, the team traded him to D.C. United for Jesse Marsch and an exchange of draft picks. On February 5, 2001, Wood was traded to the Kansas City Wizards for a third round draft pick, but was acquired back on May 9 after being waived.  On January 16, 2002, Wood retired from playing professional soccer.  Since his retirement, he has become active in coaching youth soccer and holds a position with D.C. United as a youth development coach.

External links
 MetroStars bio
 FIFA: Anthony Wood

1973 births
Living people
American soccer coaches
American soccer players
New York Red Bulls draft picks
New York Red Bulls players
Columbus Crew players
D.C. United players
MLS Pro-40 players
Olympic soccer players of the United States
Footballers at the 1996 Summer Olympics
Virginia Cavaliers men's soccer players
Soccer players from Pittsburgh
Major League Soccer players
United States men's youth international soccer players
United States men's under-23 international soccer players
Pan American Games competitors for the United States
Footballers at the 1995 Pan American Games
A-League (1995–2004) players
Association football forwards